Stéphanie Cano (born 1974) is a French handball player who has played for the French national team. She participated at the 2008 Summer Olympics in China, where the French team placed fifth.

References

1974 births
Living people
Sportspeople from Bordeaux
French female handball players
Olympic handball players of France
Handball players at the 2000 Summer Olympics
Handball players at the 2004 Summer Olympics
Handball players at the 2008 Summer Olympics
Expatriate handball players
French expatriate sportspeople in Spain
French expatriate sportspeople in Denmark
Competitors at the 2001 Mediterranean Games
Mediterranean Games gold medalists for France
Mediterranean Games medalists in handball